The women's trap competition at the 2002 Asian Games in Busan, South Korea was held on 2 October at the Changwon International Shooting Range.

Schedule
All times are Korea Standard Time (UTC+09:00)

Records

Results

Qualification

Final

References 

2002 Asian Games Report, Pages 677–678
Qualification Results
Final Results

External links
Official website

Women Shotgun T